The Kazakhstan national rugby union team, nicknamed "The Nomads", is controlled by the Kazakhstan Rugby Union.
Kazakhstan have been participating in international competition since 1994 after their independence from the USSR.

In 2007, the fortunes of the team greatly improved by winning all five of their matches and rising 14 places in the IRB World Rankings to 32nd. This rise was the biggest by any international team over the year. This led to the team being entered into the top division of the new Asian Five Nations in 2008.

Kazakhstan are now one of the leading rugby union nations in Asia, finishing second in the 2009 and 2010 Asian Five Nations to continent heavyweights Japan on both occasions. Their second-place finish in 2010 saw them advance to the four-team playoff for a final place at the 2011 Rugby World Cup. They lost 44–7 to Uruguay in Montevideo, being eliminated but it was still their best result yet.

They have yet to qualify for a Rugby World Cup finals.

The national side is ranked 64th in the world (as of 29 July 2019).

Asian Five Nations Record

 2008: 4th
 2009: 2nd
 2010: 2nd
 2011: 4th
 2012: 5th

Current squad
Squad to 2011 Asian Five Nations:
Tairzhan Arzuev
Sergey Menshikov
Vladamir Chernhik
Serik Zhanseitov
Yevginey Shekurov 	
Nikolay Zhuravlev
Alexandr Zaharov
Timur Mashurov (c)
Akhmetzan Baratov 	
Daulet Akymbekov 	
Pavel Stikhin 	
Ildar Abdrazakov
Sergey Konev
Pavel Leonov 	
Vladamir Mitin
Substitutes:
Vladamir Sitdikov
Dimitri Tkachenko
Anton Gunbin
Roman Sorokodyuba
Dimitri Tronin
Dastan Suleimenov
Evegeniy Romanov

World Cup Record

See also
 Kazakhstan women's national rugby union team
 Rugby union in Kazakhstan

External links
 Official site
 Tries and Tribulations
 Current Squad

References

 
Asian national rugby union teams
Rugby union in Kazakhstan